The 1888 Kilkenny Senior Hurling Championship was the second staging of the Kilkenny Senior Hurling Championship since its establishment by the Kilkenny County Board.

On 29 April 1888, Mooncoin won the championship after a 2-02 to 0-00 defeat of Confederation in the final.

Results

Final

References

Kilkenny Senior Hurling Championship
Kilkenny Senior Hurling Championship